Daniel Tashian is an American songwriter, producer, and multi-instrumentalist. He has spent ten years writing and producing for Big Yellow Dog Music.

Tashian's music career began when he was 19 years old and signed his first deal on Elektra Records. His first album was produced by T Bone Burnett, and he also started a band called The Silver Seas (originally called The Bees) in 1999. The success of that band lead them to an appearance on Later... with Jools Holland.

In 2018, he co-produced Kacey Musgraves' critically acclaimed album Golden Hour in addition to co-writing 7 of the album's 13 songs, including "Slow Burn", "Happy and Sad", "Love is a Wild Thing", and the album's title track, "Golden Hour". Tashian received two Grammys, one ACM award, and one CMA award for his work on the album. Other production credits include Tenille Townes' Living Room Worktapes EP, Jessie James Decker's On This Holiday album, and work for artists including A Girl Called Eddy, Trent Dabbs, Emily West, Lily & Madeleine, Lissie, and Sad Penny.

Other notable songwriting credits include his first number one song, "Hometown Girl" by Josh Turner, "White Horse" by Tenille Townes, "Good Night" by Billy Currington, and "The Bees" by Lee Ann Womack. He has also had several sync placements in hit TV shows including Pretty Little Liars, Nashville, Reign, and Scorpion as well as the film Our Idiot Brother. His band The Silver Seas also placed a song in the Breaking Bad TV series.

In 2019 Tashian released I Love Rainy Days, a children's album for which he wrote and produced all the music and painted all associated artwork, following in 2020 with Mr. Moonlight, another children's album. In July 2020, Tashian collaborated with Burt Bacharach on the EP Blue Umbrella.

Personal life
Tashian was born in Connecticut to musician parents who perform as the country and bluegrass duo Barry and Holly Tashian. He has three daughters, Tigerlily, Matilda and Tinkerbell.

Selected songwriting credits

Selected production credits

Awards

References

External links
 
 

Year of birth missing (living people)
Living people
American multi-instrumentalists
American country record producers
American male songwriters
21st-century American male musicians